Aguassay is a genus of beetles in the family Cerambycidae, containing a single species, Aguassay collaris.

References

Rhopalophorini
Monotypic Cerambycidae genera